Church of the Cross may refer to:
Church of the Cross, a historic church on Calhoun Street in Bluffton, South Carolina.
Church of the Cross, in Norwegian: Korskirken, a Church of the Church of Norway in Bergen, Norway. 
Church of the Cross, in German:  Kreuzkirche, Dresden, a Church of the Evangelical Church in Germany in Dresden, Germany.
Church of the Cross, Oslo, a former, small, Medieval parish church (Roman Catholic)  in the Old Town of Oslo, Norway, now a ruin.
Church of the Cross, Riga,  a Lutheran church in Riga, Latvia.
Ristinkirkko, (English: Church of the Cross), the main church in Lahti, Finland, designed by Alvar Aalto